1918 is a 1957 Finnish war film directed by Toivo Särkkä. It is based on the play and novel by Jarl Hemmer. The events of the film take place during the Finnish Civil War of 1918. It was entered into the 7th Berlin International Film Festival.

Cast
 Åke Lindman as Samuel Bro
 Anneli Sauli as Essi Söderman
 Ture Ara as Ceder (as Tuure Ara)
 Matti Aulos as Humalainen
 Kerttu Björlin as Avustaja
 Sirkka Breider as Naisvanki
 Kyösti Erämaa as Tuomiokapitulin jäsen
 Kaarlo Halttunen as Patruuna Bro

References

External links

1957 films
1950s war drama films
1950s Finnish-language films
Finnish war drama films
Films directed by Toivo Särkkä
Finnish black-and-white films
Finnish Civil War
1957 drama films